Marlon S. Anderson is an American attorney and politician serving as a member of the Missouri House of Representatives from the 76th district. Elected in November 2020, he assumed office on January 6, 2021.

Early life and education 
Anderson was born in  North Pointe St. Louis, Missouri. After graduating from the Gateway Institute of Technology, he earned an associate degree from St. Louis Community College, a Bachelor of Arts degree in mass media from Clark Atlanta University, and a Juris Doctor from the Southern University Law Center.

Career 
Prior to entering politics, Anderson worked for the Louisiana Public Defender Juvenile Litigations Division and the St. Louis City Circuit Attorney's Office. He later founded his own law firm. Anderson was elected to the Missouri House of Representatives in November 2020 and assumed office on January 6, 2021. Anderson is the ranking minority member of the Joint Committee on the Justice System.

Electoral history

References 

Living people
Year of birth missing (living people)
Politicians from St. Louis
St. Louis Community College alumni
Clark Atlanta University alumni
Southern University Law Center alumni
Democratic Party members of the Missouri House of Representatives
African-American state legislators in Missouri
21st-century African-American people